Tvarditsa Rocks is a group of rocks off the north coast of Greenwich Island in the South Shetland Islands, Antarctica situated  northeast of Ongley Island,  southwest of Stoker Island and  west of Sierra Island.

The rocks are named after the town of Tvarditsa in southeastern Bulgaria.

Location

See also 
 Composite Antarctic Gazetteer
 List of Antarctic islands south of 60° S
 SCAR
 Territorial claims in Antarctica

Maps
L.L. Ivanov. Antarctica: Livingston Island and Greenwich, Robert, Snow and Smith Islands. Scale 1:120000 topographic map.  Troyan: Manfred Wörner Foundation, 2009.

Notes

References
 Tvarditsa Rocks. SCAR Composite Antarctic Gazetteer
 Bulgarian Antarctic Gazetteer. Antarctic Place-names Commission. (details in Bulgarian, basic data in English)

External links
 Tvarditsa Rocks. Copernix satellite image

Rock formations of Greenwich Island
Bulgaria and the Antarctic